Malladehi is a village development committee in Baitadi District in the Mahakali Zone of western Nepal. At the time of the 1991 Nepal census it had a population of 3,440 and had 594 houses in the town.

References

Populated places in Baitadi District